The Bread Peddler (Italian:La portatrice di pane) is a 1916 Italian silent drama film directed by Giovanni Enrico Vidali. It is based on the novel of the same name by Xavier de Montépin.

Cast
 Maria Gandini 
 Emilio Rodani 
 Giovanni Enrico Vidali

References

Bibliography
 Goble, Alan. The Complete Index to Literary Sources in Film. Walter de Gruyter, 1999.

External links

1916 films
1910s Italian-language films
Films directed by Giovanni Enrico Vidali
Italian silent feature films
Films based on The Bread Peddler
Italian black-and-white films
Italian drama films
1916 drama films
Silent drama films